Emmy Kaemmerer (born 1890) was a German politician, representative of the Social Democratic Party.

Kaemmerer was born on 21 May 1890, her place and date of death are unknown.

In 1919 and 20, she was a member of the Hamburg Parliament.

References

1890 births
Year of death missing
Members of the Hamburg Parliament
Social Democratic Party of Germany politicians